Pataeta is a genus of moths in the family Euteliidae. The genus was erected by Francis Walker in 1858.

Species
Pataeta carbo (Guenée, 1852) Australia, Sulawesi
Pataeta hoenei Berio, 1964 Guangdong
Pataeta transversata Berio, 1966 Zaire, Tanzania, Mozambique

References

Euteliinae